Jason Malcolm Wilcox (born 15 March 1971) is an English football coach and former professional footballer.  Wilcox is the current director of football at English side Southampton F.C..

As a player, Wilcox was a left winger from 1989 until 2006, notably in the Premier League for Blackburn Rovers, where he won the title in 1995. He also played in the top flight for Leeds United and for Leicester City in the Championship. He retired following a brief stint in the Football League with Blackpool. He made three appearances for England.

After retiring from football, Wilcox was initially a co-commentator for BBC Radio Lancashire before moving into coaching with Manchester City in 2012. He went on to become the academy director at Premier League side Manchester City, a post he held until 2023.

Club career

Blackburn Rovers
Wilcox joined Blackburn Rovers at the age of sixteen after his father wrote to the club asking for a trial. After impressing at training on Sunday, Wilcox signed a contract on the Monday, before playing in the FA Youth Cup final only weeks after. Rovers youth-team manager Jim Furnell described him as "one of the best young midfielders in English football".

Wilcox would go on to score 33 goals in over 300 games with Blackburn, whom he also captained. Wilcox was one of the only first-team players of that era who came from the club's own youth system and was not signed from other teams with the multimillion-pound investments of Jack Walker. He played an important part in the title-winning Blackburn team of 1995. Playing on the left flank with attacking fullback Graeme Le Saux behind him and Stuart Ripley on the opposite flank, they forged a strong attacking line-up with Alan Shearer and Chris Sutton. International recognition was harder to come by for Wilcox and he managed only 3 international caps despite his effective partnership with Shearer, Le Saux and Tim Sherwood.

Lengthy injury problems restricted Wilcox's effectiveness in subsequent seasons and, after experiencing relegation with Blackburn, he moved on to Leeds United for £4 million in December 1999. With the club having just been relegated and with the emergence of Damien Duff, Rovers saw it as good business for a successful youth product. He was Blackburn's longest serving player at the time of joining Leeds.

Leeds United
Wilcox, who scored on his debut, played in his usual position as a left-sided midfielder at Leeds, moving Harry Kewell into a more advanced role. He helped the Yorkshire side to the semi-finals of the UEFA Cup, where they lost to Galatasaray. A year later he was part of the club's run to the UEFA Champions League semi-finals, where they lost again, this time to eventually consecutive runners-up Valencia.

Wilcox again suffered relegation, in 2004, as Leeds struggled with a large financial burden after failing to qualify for the Champions League, forcing the sale of several high-profile stars. He was released by Leeds in May 2004. Overall, he made 106 appearances for Leeds, scoring 6 goals.

Leicester City
In 2004, Wilcox signed on a free transfer with fellow relegated club Leicester on a one-year deal. He initially signed a one-year deal which was extended by another year in the summer of 2005. Wilcox made an excellent start to his Leicester career, but unfortunately picked up a horrific cruciate ligament injury in October 2004. It was feared it would end his season and maybe his career, but he returned in City's 3–1 win over Millwall on 2 April 2005. He scored once for Leicester, in a 3–2 win over Sheffield United in September 2004. In May 2005, he signed a new one-year contract with Leicester. In November 2005, he joined Blackpool on a one-month loan.

Blackpool
On 28 January 2006, Wilcox joined Blackpool on a free transfer following a two-month spell on loan to the club, after his old Blackburn teammate Simon Grayson requested Wilcox join the club to help save them from relegation. He was released at the end of the season after a disagreement with other staff members.

International career
Wilcox won his first England cap in a 3–0 win over Hungary in 1996. After a great debut, in which he hit the bar in the first minute, many tipped him to make the final squad for Euro 96; however, he was cut from the final squad of 22 players in what Terry Venables described as one of the toughest decisions of his career. He went on to play against France and Argentina: these turned out to be his only other full caps. Wilcox made the provisional squad for Euro 2000 but was replaced by Gareth Barry after an injury. He also made two appearances for the B team, against Chile and Hong Kong.

Coaching career
Wilcox joined the Manchester City coaching staff in 2012 as an academy coach, a year later he made the step up to the U18's as their head coach and oversaw a national championship title and two FA Youth Cup finals. In 2017 after a spell in the job on an interim basis he was appointed to the role of academy director.

Personal life
Wilcox is a black belt in judo and even represented England before he became a professional footballer. When he reached the age of seventeen he was made to choose between the two sports, only being able to fully commit himself to one of them as a potential career path.

After retiring from football, Wilcox took some time out from the game before joining the commentary staff of BBC Radio Lancashire for a year, as well as having his own weekly column in the Lancashire Telegraph.

Honours
Blackburn Rovers
Premier League: 1994–95

References

External links

Living people
1971 births
Association football wingers
English footballers
England international footballers
English male judoka
England B international footballers
Blackburn Rovers F.C. players
Leeds United F.C. players
Leicester City F.C. players
Manchester City F.C. non-playing staff
Blackpool F.C. players
Premier League players
English Football League players
Footballers from Bolton